The Law Enforcement Action Partnership (LEAP), formerly Law Enforcement Against Prohibition, is a U.S.-based nonprofit organization group of current and former police, judges, prosecutors, and other criminal justice professionals who use their expertise to advance drug policy and criminal justice solutions that enhance public safety. The organization is modeled after Vietnam Veterans Against the War. As of April 2017

, they have more than 180 representatives around the world who speak on behalf of over 5,000 law enforcement members and 100,000 supporters.

The organization transitioned from Law Enforcement Against Prohibition into the Law Enforcement Action Partnership in January 2017. They previously focused on ending the War on Drugs and now discuss a broad range of issues relating to policing and criminal justice - from procedural justice practices to reducing recidivism. Their overarching message is about reducing crime and violence and improving public safety, while the issues they discuss fall into five key areas: improving police-community relations, reducing and finding alternatives to incarceration, improving access to harm reduction services, ending the War on Drugs and global issues.

Goals
LEAP works to educate law enforcement, legislators, and the public about ways to bring about positive change in the criminal justice system. They speak to civic clubs, international conferences, and have been featured in many top U.S. media outlets.

5 Key Issue Areas

Police-Community Relations 
LEAP believes the key to improving police effectiveness is to go back to the fundamental principals of modern policing laid down by Robert Peel and improve public safety by increasing police-community trust.

Speakers advocate for solutions including treating officers for post-traumatic stress disorder; expanding police training and pay; addressing racial disparities in the justice system; abolishing stop-and-frisk practices; limiting police militarization to active shooter, hostage, and barricade incidents; ending civil asset forfeiture; and abolishing volume-based performance measures such as arrest quotas.

Incarceration 
The Law Enforcement Action Partnership advocates for alternatives to arrest and incarceration as a means of reducing crime. They support reducing the use of mandatory minimum sentences, increasing the use of effective pre-booking diversion programs, increasing the use of restorative justice conferences, reforming the money-bail system, and reforming parole and probation systems. The group aims to reduce collateral consequences caused by arrest and incarceration, reduce racial disparities in sentencing and punishment, and reduce felony disenfranchisement.

Harm Reduction 
LEAP supports harm reduction programs, which reduce the negative personal and societal consequences of drug use, including Supervised Injection Facilities, Law Enforcement Assisted Diversion (LEAD), heroin-assisted treatment, Medication Assisted Treatment, syringe exchange programs, expanded naloxone access, and treatment on demand.

The War on Drugs 
LEAP pushes to end the War on Drugs and legalize and regulate all drugs from a public health perspective as a means of reducing death, disease, and addiction associated with drug use and illegal drug sales.

Global Issues 
The Law Enforcement Action Partnership is dedicated to studying international criminal justice issues and practical solutions. LEAP considers domestic and international drug policies and their disastrous consequences, including violent criminal organizations, widespread corruption, suppression of free press, immigration crises, and state-sanctioned killings of drug users and dealers. LEAP looks to countries including Switzerland and Portugal for pioneering innovative drug policies focused on public health and safety.

Membership

Board of Directors
The Law Enforcement Action Partnership's executive board is chaired by Lt. Diane Goldstein (Ret.) of the Redondo Beach Police Department in California. Board members include: Inge Fryklund, former Assistant State's Attorney in Chicago; Stephen Gutwillig, a professional nonprofit organizational development consultant; Jody David Armour, Professor of Law at the University of Southern California, Los Angeles, California; executive director Maj. Neill Franklin (Ret.) of the Baltimore and Maryland State Police Departments; Capt. Leigh Maddox (Ret.) of the Maryland State Police; Allison Watson, former Assistant District Attorney in Knoxville, Tennessee; and Det. Sergeant Neil Woods (Ret.) of Derbyshire, England.

Advisory board
The advisory board of Law Enforcement Against Prohibition consists of Romesh Bhattacharji, former drug czar (India); Vince Cain, former Chief Coroner of British Columbia and retired RCMP chief superintendent (Canada); Senator Larry Campbell, former mayor of Vancouver and retired RCMP officer (Canada); retired Supreme Court Justice Kenneth Crispin (Australia), Member of Parliament Libby Davies (Canada); Carel Edwards, former anti-drug coordinator for the European Union; U.S. District Court Judge Warren William Eginton; Gustavo de Greiff, former Attorney General of Colombia; Gary Johnson, former Governor of New Mexico; Judge John L. Kane Jr., United States District Court for the District of Colorado; Justice Ketil Lund, retired Supreme Court Justice from Norway; Sheriff Bill Masters, Colorado; Joseph McNamara, retired police chief of the San Jose Police Department; Norm Stamper, retired police chief of the Seattle Police Department; Eric Sterling, president of the Criminal Justice Policy Foundation; Thomas P. Sullivan, former U.S. Attorney for the Northern District of Illinois; Robert W. Sweet, Senior Judge of the US District Court Southern District of New York; Hans van Dujin, retired Dutch police union president (the Netherlands); Francis Wilkinson, former Chief Constable of the Gwent Police Force (United Kingdom); and Justice C. Ross (Ret.), former British Columbia Supreme Court judge (Canada).

Speakers bureau
Representatives of the Law Enforcement Action Partnership are trained to speak with audiences and media outlets on behalf of the organization. They include current and former/retired police officers, military police officers, judges, prosecutors, prison wardens and other corrections officials, parole and probation officers, and FBI and DEA agents.

Activities

Media
Each year, speakers conduct hundreds of interviews with outlets across the country, including AP, Newsweek, BBC, The Washington Post, FOX News, CNN, The Atlantic, The Intercept, Reason magazine, The Hill, The Guardian, The Washington Times, The Los Angeles Times, and others. They are regularly featured in documentaries, viral social media content, and local radio and TV segments.

Events 
Representatives are regularly involved in speaking engagements in state legislatures and at press conferences, civic clubs, conferences and universities.

See also
 Drug Policy Alliance
 DrugWarRant
 Freedom of thought
 NORML (National Organization for the Reform of Marijuana Laws)
 Prohibition
 Students for Sensible Drug Policy
 War on Drugs
 Doctors for Cannabis Regulation

References

External links

LEAP's Promotional Video
Documentary film
"Proposed Amendment of United Nations Drug Treaties -- 2014"
2014 Letter To World Leaders

2002 establishments in Massachusetts
Cannabis law reform organizations based in the United States
Drug policy organizations based in the United States
Drug policy reform
Law enforcement non-governmental organizations in the United States
Non-profit organizations based in Massachusetts
Organizations established in 2002
2002 in cannabis
501(c)(3) organizations